The 1964 Wisconsin gubernatorial election was held on November 3, 1964.   Republican Warren P. Knowles won the election with 51% of the vote, winning his first term as Governor of Wisconsin and defeating incumbent Democrat John W. Reynolds.

Results

References

1964 Wisconsin elections
Wisconsin
1964